is a passenger railway station located in the city of Miki, Hyōgo Prefecture, Japan, operated by the private Kobe Electric Railway (Shintetsu). There was a station with the same name on the Miki Railway Miki Line which ended operation on March 31, 2008 and abandoned the next day.

Lines

Station layout
The station consists of two opposed ground-level side platforms connected to the station building by a level crossing. The station is unattended.

Platforms

Adjacent stations

History

It was renamed  on January 1, 1954, and renamed again to its present name on April 1, 1988.

On March 4, 2018 at around 6 p.m. (local time), fire from a neighboring two-story house spread to the station. Both structures were destroyed in the blaze. The southward part of the station closed temporarily on the next day before reopened on March 9.

Passenger statistics
In fiscal 2019, the station was used by an average of 852 passengers daily.

Surrounding area
Ōmiya Hachiman Shrine
Hyogo Prefectural Miki High School 
 Miki Municipal Miki Junior High School
 Miki City Miki Elementary School

See also
List of railway stations in Japan

References

External links

 Official website (Kobe Electric Railway) 

Railway stations in Japan opened in 1938
Railway stations in Hyōgo Prefecture
Miki, Hyōgo